Andrew Barth Feldman (born May 7, 2002) is an American actor and singer. He began his acting career in musical theater by participating in local productions as a child. After winning the award for Best Actor at the National High School Musical Theater Awards, he joined the cast of Dear Evan Hansen on Broadway in the title role. During his run in the show, he had his own Broadway.com vlog and he has his own YouTube channel under his name. He began his own theatre company, Zneefrock Productions, to raise money for autism awareness. He can be heard playing himself in As the Curtain Rises, an original Broadway soap opera podcast from the Broadway Podcast Network.

Early life and education 
Feldman was born in Manhasset, New York. He became a fan of musical theater at a very young age after watching a production of Beauty and the Beast at age three. Feldman was raised with an older sister and closely with his cousins, whom he calls his brothers. They grew up near his mother's childhood hometown. He went on to star in various local and school productions, including Annie, Grease, and Rent. He started a YouTube channel in high school to do projects for school.

He also founded his own musical theater company in middle school, Zneefrock Productions, as part of his Bar Mitzvah project to raise money for autism research. He and a friend wrote and directed a Star Wars parody musical for the company, which would later be put on at 54 Below with professional actors. He attended Lawrence Woodmere Academy, where his mother worked as an administrator before passing away in August 2019. After taking time off of high school to star in Dear Evan Hansen, Feldman initially decided to attend Harvard University in the Fall of 2020, but he deferred his enrollment a year to 2021 because of the COVID-19 pandemic.

Acting career 
In 2018, his sophomore year of high school, Feldman portrayed Frank Abagnale Jr. in his high school's production of the musical Catch Me If You Can. After winning his regional awards program for this performance, he was invited to perform at the Jimmy Awards, where he won the award for best actor. Stacey Mindich, the lead producer of Dear Evan Hansen, noticed his performance and asked him to audition for the role of Evan Hansen on Broadway. On January 30, 2019, at the age of 16, Feldman assumed the role of Evan Hansen, taking over for Taylor Trensch. His performance was lauded, with Sarah Bahr in the New York Times writing, "Andrew Barth Feldman made me forget where I was, who I was, that I was anything other than part of the world onstage...I'm pretty sure I didn't draw breath the entire first act." He exited the role on January 26, 2020, upon which Jordan Fisher took over the role.

Feldman began a fundraiser for the Actor's Fund called Broadway Jackbox in March 2020, alongside former Dear Evan Hansen co-star Alex Boniello. This fundraiser streamed on Twitch, with famous Broadway and screen actors each week. He additionally created a murder mystery series called Broadway Whodunit, which stars Broadway and theatre actors. 

On December 28, 2020, it was announced that Feldman would star as Linguini in a benefit concert presentation of Ratatouille the Musical, an internet meme that originated on TikTok, inspired by the 2007 Disney/Pixar film. The concert streamed exclusively on TodayTix on January 1, 2021. His performance was celebrated, with Jesse Green writing in the New York Times that Feldman "seems to have animated his face to match Pixar’s version: He’s instantly adorable while looking like he still might gnaw your toe."

On February 11, 2021, it was announced that Feldman would make his television acting debut in the Disney+ show, High School Musical: The Musical: The Series, as a recurring guest star for season 2. He plays Antoine, a French exchange student.

On May 7, 2021, Feldman, appeared in 2019 Jimmy Award finalist Casey Likes' short film Thespians.

On May 6, 2022, it was announced that Feldman would make his feature film acting debut in the upcoming Netflix film A Tourist's Guide to Love.

Music 
On July 8, 2021, Feldman released his first single "Every Pretty Girl" about falling in love as a teenager with OCD. On Christmas Eve 2021, Feldman released his second single "Emma." Also, in July 2021, Feldman was featured on American actress and singer Cozi Zuehlsdorff's single "The Old Me and You." On September 23, 2022, Feldman and Joe Serafini released "In My Head", a duet written by songwriters Daniel Mertzlufft and Jacob Ryan Smith about the budding romance between two young men.

Credits

Film

Television

Stage

Music video

Music

Awards

References

External links 
 
 

2002 births
21st-century American male actors
American male musical theatre actors
American male television actors
American male film actors
Jewish American male actors
Living people
Male actors from New York (state)
People from Manhasset, New York
People from Woodmere, New York
21st-century American Jews
Lawrence Woodmere Academy alumni